The Hass avocado is a variety of avocado with dark green, bumpy skin. It was first grown and sold by Southern California mail carrier and amateur horticulturist Rudolph Hass, who also gave it his name.

The Hass avocado is a large-sized fruit weighing 200 to 300 grams (8 to 10 oz). When ripe, the skin becomes a dark purplish-black and yields to gentle pressure. When ready to serve, it becomes white-green in the middle part of the inner fruit.

Owing to its taste, size, shelf-life, high growing yield and in some areas, year-round harvesting, the Hass cultivar is the most commercially popular avocado worldwide. In the United States it accounts for more than 80% of the avocado crop, 95% of the California crop and is the most widely grown avocado in New Zealand.

History

All commercial, fruit-bearing Hass avocado trees have been grown from grafted seedlings propagated from a single tree that was grown from a seed bought by Rudolph Hass in 1926 from A. R. Rideout of Whittier, California. At the time, Rideout was getting seeds from any source he could find, even restaurant food scraps. The cultivar this seed came from is not known. In 2019, the National Academy of Sciences published a genetic study concluding that the Hass avocado is a cross between Mexican (61%) and Guatemalan (39%) avocado varieties.

In 1926, at his 1.5-acre grove at 430 West Road, La Habra Heights, California, Hass planted three seeds he had bought from Rideout, which yielded one strong seedling. After trying and failing at least twice to graft the seedling with branches from Fuerte avocado trees (the leading commercial cultivar at the time), Hass thought of cutting it down but a professional grafter named Caulkins told him the young tree was sound and strong, so he let it be. When the tree began bearing odd, bumpy fruit, his children liked the taste. As the tree's yields grew bigger, Hass easily sold what his family didn't eat to co-workers at the post office. The Hass avocado had one of its first commercial successes at the Model Grocery Store on Colorado Street in Pasadena, California, where chefs working for some of the town's wealthy residents bought the new cultivar's big, nutty-tasting fruit for $1 each, a very high price at the time.

Hass patented the tree in 1935 and made a contract with Whittier nurseryman Harold Brokaw to grow and sell grafted seedlings propagated from its cuttings. with Brokaw getting 75% of the proceeds. Brokaw then specialized in the Hass and often sold out of grafted seedlings since, unlike the Fuerte, Hass yields are year-round and also more plentiful, with bigger fruit, a longer shelf life and richer flavor owing to higher oil content. However, Hass made a profit of less than US$5,000 through the patent because cuttings from single trees sold by Brokaw were then propagated to graft whole orchards.

Rudolph Hass carried on as a postman throughout his life and died of a heart attack at Fallbrook Hospital in Fallbrook, California, in 1952, the same year his patent expired and not long after he had established a new  orchard.

By the early 21st century the US avocado industry took in over $1 billion a year from the heavy-bearing, high quality Hass cultivar, which accounted for around 80% of all avocados grown worldwide.

The mother tree 
Owing to later suburban sprawl in Southern California, the mother tree stood for many years in front of a residence in La Habra Heights. The tree died when it was 76 years old and was cut down on 11 September 2002 after a ten-year fight with phytophthora (root rot), which often kills avocado trees. Two plaques by the private residence at 426 West Road mark the spot where it grew. The wood was stored in a tree nursery and from this stock, a nephew of Rudolph Hass, Dick Stewart, made keepsakes, jewelry and other gifts. From 2010 to 2013, in mid-May, and starting again in September 2018, the city of La Habra Heights celebrated the Hass avocado at its Annual La Habra Heights Avocado Festival.

Bearing pattern 
Hass avocado trees, like some other cultivars, may only bear well every other year. After a year with low yield, often because of cold, for which the tree does not have much tolerance, yields may be very high the next year. However, the heavy crop can deplete stored carbohydrates, lowering the following season's yield and this can set the tree into a lifelong alternate bearing pattern. Southern California Hass Avocado groves have good soil and drainage, plentiful sunlight and cool gentle winds from the oceans which help the fruit grow. These conditions hold throughout the year, so there are always fresh harvests of Hass avocados in Southern California.

Nutritional value

Raw avocado is 73% water, 15% fat, 9% carbohydrates, and 2% protein (table). As reliable sources are not available for the micronutrient content specifically of Hass avocados, US Department of Agriculture data for a "commercial variety" is used. A 100-gram reference amount supplies  of food energy and is rich (20% or higher of the Daily Value, DV) in several B vitamins and vitamin K, with moderate content (10-19% DV) of vitamin C, vitamin E, and potassium (right table, USDA nutrient data). Hass avocados contain phytosterols and carotenoids, including lutein and zeaxanthin.

Avocados have diverse fats. For a typical avocado:
 About 75% of an avocado's energy comes from fat, most of which (67% of total fat) is monounsaturated fat as oleic acid.
 Other predominant fats include palmitic acid and linoleic acid.
 The saturated fat content amounts to 14% of the total fat.
 Typical total fat composition is roughly: 1% ω-3, 14% ω-6, 71% ω-9 (65% oleic and 6% palmitoleic), and 14% saturated fat (palmitic acid).

References 

Avocado cultivars